A by-election for the seat of Boorowa in the New South Wales Legislative Assembly was held on 24 January 1895 because Thomas Slattery resigned to concentrate on his legal practice.

Dates

Result

Thomas Slattery resigned.

See also
Electoral results for the district of Boorowa
List of New South Wales state by-elections

Notes

References

1895 elections in Australia
New South Wales state by-elections
1890s in New South Wales